Pietro Ghedin (born 21 November 1952) is an Italian football coach and former player who last managed the Maltese national team.

Playing career
Born in Scorzè, Ghedin played as a defender for Venezia, Fiorentina, Catania, Lazio, Pescara, Pistoiese and Siena.

Coaching career
Ghedin began his coaching career with the Italian Football Federation in 1987, which included managing the under-18 team. He served as both goalkeeper coach and assistant manager to the Italian senior side, and managed the Italy women's team between 2005 and 2012.

Ghedin was manager of the Malta national team between 1992 and 1995, also managing the under-21 team at the same time, and was reappointed in May 2012. He left the job on 11 October 2017, as Tom Saintfiet was appointed as the new head coach.

Managerial statistics

References

1952 births
Living people
Italian footballers
Venezia F.C. players
ACF Fiorentina players
Catania S.S.D. players
S.S. Lazio players
Delfino Pescara 1936 players
U.S. Pistoiese 1921 players
A.C.N. Siena 1904 players
Serie A players
Serie B players
Association football defenders
Italian football managers
Italian expatriate football managers
Expatriate football managers in Malta
Malta national football team managers
Italy women's national football team managers